Picture Show is the second studio album by American rock band Neon Trees. The lead single, "Everybody Talks", was released on December 20, 2011, and the album was released on April 17, 2012. The music video for "Everybody Talks" was released on March 8, 2012.

On March 15, 2012 an interview with Neon Trees stated that Picture Show would have 11 tracks and 4 bonus tracks. On March 19, the cover art for Picture Show was released, and on March 27, the cover art for the deluxe edition was revealed on their livestream appearance, along with confirmation of a vinyl version that will available for the deluxe edition.

The album was produced by Justin Meldal-Johnsen, mixed by Billy Bush and engineered by Carlos de la Garza, Billy Bush and Greg Collins. It was mastered by Joe LaPorta.

"Everybody Talks" was used in the Homeland episode "Q&A". The episode aired on October 28, 2012.

"Moving in the Dark" was used in the NCIS episode "Namesake". The episode aired on October 30, 2012.

Promotion
The band released their lead single, "Everybody Talks" in December 2011 and a video followed in early March 2012. The single has currently peaked at number 6 on the Billboard Hot 100, and the top 20 of 7 other major charts on Billboard.

The band also went on tour with AWOLNATION across the country, and has toured college campuses/festivals alone.

Reception

The album debuted at number 77 in Canada, and number 17 on the United States Billboard 200. Picture Show received generally mixed to positive reviews. At Metacritic, which assigns a normalized rating out of 100 to reviews from mainstream critics, the album received an average score of 63, based on 7 reviews, which indicates "generally favorable reviews". Billboard gave the album a mixed review, saying that Neon Trees were successful in keeping their new album similar to its predecessor, Habits, but their experimenting did not pay off (with songs like, "Trust" that last over 6 minutes). Similarly, Rolling Stone gave the album 3 stars out of 5, also saying that, "Four of its last five tracks exceed five minutes. Neon Trees clearly hope there's life beyond bubblegum". Entertainment Weekly similarly gave the album a C+ grade.

Track listing

Personnel
Neon Trees
 Tyler Glenn – lead vocals, background vocals, keyboards, synthesizers, programming
 Branden Campbell – bass, background vocals
 Christopher Allen – guitars, background vocals
 Elaine Bradley – drums, percussion, background vocals, lead vocals on "Mad Love"

Additional Musicians
 Justin Meldal Johnsen – guitars, keyboards, background vocals, programming, percussion
 Carlos de la Garza – percussion
 Kaskade – additional vocals & production on "Lessons In Love (All Day, All Night)"

Horn Section
 David Ralicke – tenor saxophone, alto saxophone
 Jordan Katz – trumpet
 Steve Baxter – trombone

Release history

References

Neon Trees albums
2012 albums
Island Records albums
Albums produced by Justin Meldal-Johnsen